Vadim Bolohan (born 15 August 1986) is a Moldovan footballer who plays as a defender for Milsami Orhei and the Moldova national team.

Career
During the 2008–09 summer transfer season, he transferred to Zorya from Dacia Chișinău. While playing for the Moldova national under-21 football team, he played as a central defender and also wore the captain's badge. Bolohan left Zorya in January 2010 and signed for PFK Sevastopol.

International goals
Scores and results list Moldova's goal tally first.

References

External links

 

1986 births
Living people
People from Sîngerei District
Moldovan footballers
Moldova youth international footballers
Moldova under-21 international footballers
Moldova international footballers
Moldovan expatriate footballers
Expatriate footballers in Ukraine
Moldovan expatriate sportspeople in Ukraine
FC Agro-Goliador Chișinău players
FC Baltika Kaliningrad players
FC Nistru Otaci players
FC Dacia Chișinău players
FC Zorya Luhansk players
FC Hoverla Uzhhorod players
FC Sevastopol players
FC Karpaty Lviv players
FC Rapid Ghidighici players
FC Milsami Orhei players
Moldovan Super Liga players
Ukrainian Premier League players
Association football defenders